"Here Comes Peter Cottontail" is a popular secular Easter song composed in 1949, by Steve Nelson and Jack Rollins.  They also wrote "Frosty the Snowman" in 1950.  Mervin Shiner was the first person to record the song, on Decca Records in 1950. It reached #8 on Billboard Hot 100. The name 'Peter Cottontail' was used by a character in a 1914 Thornton Burgess book, but may not have been previously used to refer to the Easter Bunny.

Due to the immense popularity of Gene Autry's Christmas songs "Here Comes Santa Claus" and "Rudolph the Red Nosed Reindeer", Nelson and Rollins asked Autry to record their song. His 1950 version was on the Columbia label and peaked at number 3 on the U.S Billboard Hot Country Singles chart and at number 5 on the Billboard Hot 100 chart.

Nelson and Rollins also wrote non-Easter lyrics to the tune that later appeared on the 1963 Walt Disney Records Peter Cottontail Plus Other Funny Bunnies and their Friends.

Chart performance

Gene Autry

Jimmy Wakely

Johnnie Lee Wills

References

1950 singles
Easter songs
Songs about rabbits and hares
Gene Autry songs
Jimmy Wakely songs
Johnnie Lee Wills songs
Songs written by Walter E. "Jack" Rollins
1949 songs
Songs written by Steve Nelson (songwriter)